HD 240237 b is a super-Jupiter exoplanet orbiting the K-type giant star HD 240237 about 4,900 light-years (1,500 parsecs, or nearly  km) away from Earth in the constellation Cassiopeia. It orbits outside of the habitable zone of its star at a distance of 1.9 AU. The exoplanet was found by using the radial velocity method, from radial-velocity measurements via observation of Doppler shifts in the spectrum of the planet's parent star. The planet has a mildly eccentric orbit.

Characteristics

Mass, radius and temperature
HD 240237 b is a "super-Jupiter", an exoplanet that has a radius and mass larger than that of the gas giants Jupiter and Saturn. It has an estimated mass of around 5.3  and a potential radius of around 9% larger than Jupiter (1.11 , or 12.2 ) based on its mass, since it is more massive than the jovian planet.

Host star
The planet orbits a (K-type) giant star named HD 240237. It has exhausted the hydrogen supply in its core and is currently fusing helium. The star has a mass of 1.69  and a radius of around 32 . It has a surface temperature of 4361K and is likely 2 billion years old based on its mass and evolution. In comparison, the Sun is about 4.6 billion years old and has a surface temperature of 5778 K.

The star's apparent magnitude, or how bright it appears from Earth's perspective, is 8.19. Therefore, HD 240237 is too dim to be seen with the naked eye.

Orbit 
HD 240237 b orbits its star with nearly 331 times the Sun's luminosity (331 ) every 746 days at a distance of 1.9 AU (compared to Mars' orbital distance from the Sun, which is 1.52 AU). It has a mildly eccentric orbit, with an eccentricity of 0.4.

Discovery 
The planet was detected through Doppler spectroscopy, the method of observing exoplanets through the measurement of radial velocities of a star. If there is a wobble, it could mean that there is a possible planetary companion orbiting it.

Observations were taken with the Hobby–Eberly Telescope equipped with the High-Resolution Spectrograph in a queue-scheduled mode. From July 2004 to October 2009, 40 epochs were measured, with SNR values ranging from 161–450. These observations eventually led the team to conclude that there was in fact a planetary companion orbiting around HD 240237, and they estimated its parameters to be a mass of 5.3 times that of Jupiter, an orbital period of 746 days, an eccentricity of 0.4, and a semi-major axis of 1.9 AU. The discovery, along with 2 other exoplanets, were announced on October 9, 2011.

See also 
 Epsilon Tauri b

References

External links 
 

Cassiopeia (constellation)
Giant planets
Exoplanets discovered in 2011
Exoplanets detected by radial velocity